This is a list of radio stations in the State of San Luis Potosí, in amplitude modulation (AM) and frequency modulation (FM) bands.

Ciudad Valles, S.L.P. 

Frequency modulation

Matehuala, S.L.P. 

Amplitude modulation

Frequency modulation

Río Verde, S.L.P. 

Frequency modulation

San Luis Potosí, S.L.P. 

Amplitude modulation

Shortwave

Frequency modulation

NA: Not available

Information:
 To listen to the station online, just click on the name of the broadcaster.
 List of stations updated as of December 13, 2018. Information based on the list of AM and FM stations of the Federal Telecommunications Institute.
 List of stations published according to the formats that are currently on the air, not including possible changes in name and/or genre that have not yet been confirmed in the short or medium term.

Tamazunchale, S.L.P. 

Frequency modulation

Tancanhuitz de los Santos, S.L.P. 

Amplitude modulation

Previous formats

Ciudad Valles, S.L.P. 

Amplitude modulation

Data before the AM station starts broadcasting on FM.

Matehuala, S.L.P. 

Amplitude modulation

San Luis Potosí, S.L.P. 

Amplitude modulation

Data before the AM station starts broadcasting on FM.

Frequency modulation

Frequency changes

Ciudad Valles, S.L.P. 

Frequency modulation

Matehuala, S.L.P. 

Amplitude modulation

Frequency modulation

Río Verde, S.L.P. 

Amplitude modulation

San Luis Potosí, S.L.P. 

Amplitude modulation

Frequency modulation

Tancanhuitz de los Santos, S.L.P. 

Amplitude modulation

Notes 

 All the AM radio stations in San Luis Potosí that have acquired an FM frequency means that they are going to change their frequency, except for station XEBM-AM because its FM frequency is additional.

References 		

San Luis Potosí
Radio stations in San Luis Potosí